Walter Robert Mutimer (30 July 1907 – 14 October 1984) was an Australian rules footballer who played with Carlton and Fitzroy in the Victorian Football League (VFL).

Family
The son of Henry Basil Mutimer (1865-1944), and Mary Selina Mutimer (1864-1952), née Stephens, Walter Robert Mutimer was born in Carlton North, Victoria on 30 July 1907.

He married Alice May Sheppard (1908-1994) on 15 April 1926.

Notes

References 
 Brunswick Clearances Unlikely: Maynes and Mutimer to Stay, The Age, (Friday, 6 April 1934), p.6.
 Dunstan, A.E., "Dissatisfied with Form: Why Brunswick Agreed: Five Clearances, The Herald, (Thursday, 28 June 1934), p.30.
 Brunswick Resents Transfer Allegations, The Herald, (Saturday, 7 July 1934), p.4.
 Mutimer Cleared to Fitzroy, The Age, (Monday, 10 May 1937), p.18.
 [http://nla.gov.au/nla.news-article12100349 Wal. Mutimer Retires, The Argus', (Thursday, 23 February 1939), p.18.]
 Carlton, The Sporting Globe, (Saturday, 17 April 1943), p.3.
 

 External links 
 
 
 Wally Mutimer's profile at Blueseum
 Wally Mutimer, at The VFA Project''.

1907 births
1984 deaths
Australian rules footballers from Melbourne
Northcote Football Club players
Brunswick Football Club players
Carlton Football Club players
Fitzroy Football Club players
People from Carlton North, Victoria